The Democratic Alliance, formerly called Yuen Long Tin Shui Wai Democratic Alliance, was a small pro-democracy pro-ROC political group in Hong Kong established in 2003 and dissolved in 2021. The final chairman of the alliance was Johnny Mak Ip-sing, who was also a member of Yuen Long District Council.

History
The alliance was established in 2003 by a group of pro-Kuomintang politicians under the initiatives of the Legislative Council member Albert Chan Wai-yip after he split from the Democratic Party and wanted to consolidate his political base in the New Territories West.

The group filed five members in the Yuen Long District in the 2003 District Council elections, and won three seats in the Yuen Long District Council, while Albert Chan Wai Yip himself retained his seat in the Tsuen Wan District. The Democratic Alliance became part of Albert Chan's radical pro-democracy alliance People Power in 2011. Johnny Mak became the only People Power candidate win a seat in the 2011 District Council elections. In 2012, the Democratic Alliance broke apart from the People Power as Johnny Mak wanted to lead a candidate list in the coming 2012 LegCo elections. The group failed to win a seat in the New Territories West constituency.

Electoral performance

Legislative Council elections

District Councils elections

References

External links
Official web site

2003 establishments in Hong Kong
Political parties in Hong Kong
Pro-democracy camp (Hong Kong)
Three Principles of the People
Yuen Long District